Newport Titans RLFC were a rugby league side based in the city of Newport, South Wales. Since 2013, they have been based at Newport Saracens RFC. They played in the Welsh Premier of the Rugby League Conference.

History
Newport Titans RLFC were formed in 2004 as founder members of the new Rugby League Conference Welsh Division. The founding members found a home for the Titans at Pill Harriers RFC and appointed former international Dai Watkins as President. In their inaugural season Titans finished fourth in the table and were Welsh Shield runners-up.

The Titans were close to winning the Welsh Grand Final in 2007.

They won the Welsh plate in 2009 beating Dinefwr Sharks in the final.

Newport Titans dropped the 'Newport' preface from their name in 2011 when they moved to Machen RFC. The Titans remained here for two seasons.

The "Newport" preface was again used for the Titans on their return to Newport in 2013. Newport Titans have no future plans to move back out of the city.

Club honours
Welsh Conference Shield winners 2005; runners-up 2004.
Welsh Conference finalists 2007.
Welsh Plate: 2009

History
Record League victory: 106-16 vs. Swansea Valley May 15, 2005 (first ever 100-pointer in the Welsh Conference).
Record League defeat: 20-70 vs. Bridgend Blue Bulls July 9, 2005.

Juniors
Titans' junior teams take part in the Welsh Conference Junior League. A new U13s Junior team is looking to be set up for the 2014 season.

External links
 Official Wales Rugby League website

Rugby League Conference teams
Rugby league in Wales
Sport in Newport, Wales
Welsh rugby league teams
Rugby clubs established in 2004